Romo is the surname of:

 Alfonso Romo (born 1950), Mexican businessman
 Bárbara Romo Fonseca (born 1977), Mexican politician
 Bruno Romo (born 1989), Chilean footballer
 David Romo (born 1978), French former footballer
 Drew Romo (born 2001), American baseball player
 Eneko Romo (born 1979), Spanish footballer
 Enrique Romo (born 1947), Mexican former Major League Baseball pitcher, brother of Vicente Romo
 Isaac Romo (born 1983), Mexican footballer
 Jorge Romo (1924-2014), Mexican footballer
 Jorge Romo (Chilean footballer) (born 1990)
 Jorge Villalpando Romo (born 1985), Mexican footballer
 José Ramón Romo (born 1963), Spanish retired footballer
 Julio Salas Romo (1913-unknown), Chilean chess player
 Lawrence Romo, American civil servant and former US Air Force lieutenant colonel
 Miguel Romo Medina (born 1949), Mexican politician
 Olle Romo, Swedish music producer, songwriter and drummer
 Osvaldo Romo (c. 1938-2007), Chilean intelligence agent and torturer
 Pedro Romo (actor) (born 1957), Mexican actor and comedian
 Pedro Romo (footballer) (born 1989), Ecuadorian footballer
 Rafael Romo (born 1990), Venezuelan footballer
 Ricardo Romo (born 1943), American President of the University of Texas at San Antonio and urban historian
 Sergio Romo (born 1983), American Major League Baseball pitcher
 Sonia Romo Verdesoto, Ecuadorian poet
 Tony Romo (born 1980), American football quarterback and broadcaster
 Verónica Escobar Romo (born 1955), Mexican lawyer and politician, former mayor of Acapulco
 Vicente Romo (born 1943), Mexican former Major League Baseball pitcher
 Ximena Romo (born 1990), Mexican actress

See also
 Gilda Cruz-Romo (born 1940), Mexican operatic soprano